Mary Ann Kennedy is the name of:
Mary Ann Kennedy (American singer), country music artist
Mary Ann Kennedy (Scottish singer) (born 1968), also a radio presenter

See also
Mary Kennedy (disambiguation)
Ann Kennedy (disambiguation)